Senator Jacobson may refer to:

Jeff Jacobson (politician) (fl. 1990s–2000s), Ohio State Senate in the US
Judy Jacobson (1939–2019), Montana State Senate in the US
John G. Jacobson (1869–1929), American politician

See also
Ken Jacobsen (born 1945), Washington State Senate
Jacobson (disambiguation)